47th meridian may refer to:

47th meridian east, a line of longitude east of the Greenwich Meridian
47th meridian west, a line of longitude west of the Greenwich Meridian